William Glisson (8 July 1882 – 10 August 1964) was a South African cricketer. He played in seventeen first-class matches for Eastern Province from 1906/07 to 1922/23.

See also
 List of Eastern Province representative cricketers

References

External links
 

1882 births
1964 deaths
South African cricketers
Eastern Province cricketers
Cricketers from Port Elizabeth